So Fresh: The Hits of Summer 2010 & The Best of 2009 is a compilation of songs which were popular on the ARIA Charts of Australia in 2009, and hits in summer 2010. The album was released on 20 November 2009.

Track listing

Disc 1
 Vanessa Amorosi – "This Is Who I Am" (3:26)
 The Black Eyed Peas – "Meet Me Halfway" (3:46)
 Britney Spears – "3" (3:25)
 Taylor Swift – "Fifteen" (4:55)
 Guy Sebastian featuring Jordin Sparks – "Art of Love" (4:00)
 Kesha – "Tik Tok" (3:20)
 La Roux – "Bulletproof" (3:27)
 The All-American Rejects – "I Wanna" (3:29)
 Powderfinger – "All of the Dreamers" (3:37)
 Mika – "We Are Golden" (3:30)
 A. R. Rahman and The Pussycat Dolls featuring Nicole Scherzinger – "Jai Ho! (You Are My Destiny)" (3:42)
 Kelly Clarkson – "My Life Would Suck Without You" (3:33)
 Gossip – "Love Long Distance" (4:26)
 Kate Miller-Heidke – "Caught in the Crowd" (3:33)
 Wale featuring Lady Gaga – "Chillin" (3:17)
 Dizzee Rascal – "Holiday" (3:40)
 Calvin Harris – "Ready for the Weekend" (3:37)
 Jay Sean featuring Lil Wayne – "Down" (3:32)
 Kevin Rudolf featuring Lil Wayne – "Let It Rock" (3:52)
 Kid Cudi vs. Crookers – "Day 'n' Nite" (2:44)
 Wolfmother – "New Moon Rising" (3:46)

Disc 2
 Pink – "I Don't Believe You" (4:36)
 Jessica Mauboy – "Let Me Be Me" (3:49)
 Mariah Carey – "Obsessed" (4:02)
 Pixie Lott – "Boys and Girls" (3:03)
 Beyoncé – "Single Ladies (Put a Ring on It)" (3:13)
 Orianthi – "According to You" (3:20)
 Bluejuice – "Broken Leg" (2:59)
 Newton Faulkner – "If This Is It" (4:01)
 The Fray – "You Found Me" (4:03)
 Cassie Davis – "No More" (3:41)
 Ciara featuring Justin Timberlake – "Love Sex Magic" (3:41)
 Jordin Sparks – "S.O.S. (Let the Music Play)" (3:33)
 The Script – "Before the Worst" (3:23)
 Little Birdy – "Summarize" (3:19)
 Akon featuring Colby O'Donis and Kardinal Offishall – "Beautiful" (5:13)
 Shakira – "She Wolf" (3:08)
 Rihanna – "Rehab" (4:55)
 Sean Kingston – "Fire Burning" (4:02)
 Backstreet Boys – "Straight Through My Heart" (3:27)
 Damien Leith – "To Get to You" (3:35)
 Wes Carr – "Feels Like Woah" (3:14)

Charts

Year-end charts

Certifications

References

So Fresh albums
2009 compilation albums
2010 in Australian music